Adelomelon is a genus of sea snails, marine gastropod mollusks in the family Volutidae.

Description
The medium-sized to large shell is smooth or knobbed. The protoconch is small  and smooth with or without a calcarella.

Species
Species within the genus Adelomelon include:
 Adelomelon ancilla (Lightfoot, 1786)
 Adelomelon beckii (Broderip, 1836)
 Adelomelon brasiliana (Lamarck, 1811)
 Adelomelon ferussacii (Donovan, 1824)
 † Adelomelon posei F. Scarabino, Martinez, del Río, Oleinik, Camacho & Zinsmeister, 2004 
 Adelomelon riosi Clench & Turner, 1964
 Adelomelon scoresbyana (Powell, 1951)
  † Adelomelon valdesiense F. Scarabino, Martinez, del Río, Oleinik, Camacho & Zinsmeister, 2004
Species brought into synonymy
 Adelomelon barattinii Klappenbach & Ureta, 1966 : synonym of Adelomelon (Adelomelon) ancilla (Lightfoot, 1786) represented as Adelomelon ancilla (Lightfoot, 1786)
 Adelomelon indigestus Von Ihering, 1908: synonym of Adelomelon (Adelomelon) beckii (Broderip, 1836) represented as Adelomelon beckii (Broderip, 1836)
 Adelomelon paradoxa (Lahille, 1895): synonym of Odontocymbiola magellanica (Gmelin, 1791)
 Adelomelon subnodosa (Leach, 1814): synonym of Odontocymbiola magellanica (Gmelin, 1791)

References

 Bail P. & Poppe G.T. 2001. A conchological iconography: a taxonomic introduction of the recent Volutidae. ConchBooks, Hackenheim. 30 pp, 5 pl.

External links 

Volutidae